The 2022 Houston Gamblers season was the first season for the Houston Gamblers as a professional American football franchise. They played as charter members of the United States Football League, one of eight teams to compete in the league for the 2022 season. The Gamblers technically played as a traveling team (since the entirety of the regular season was played at Protective Stadium and Legion Field in Birmingham, Alabama) and were led by head coach Kevin Sumlin.

Background and history
As is the case with all eight teams competing in the league, the Houston Gamblers take their name and color scheme from a franchise of the same name that competed in the original USFL. The original Houston Gamblers, who competed in the USFL from 1984 to 1985, finished with a winning record in both of their seasons, and won one Western Conference championship. They were led by head coach Jack Pardee for the duration of their existence.

The identical team names were the subject of a lawsuit brought to Fox by the owners of the original USFL, who claimed trademark infringement and false advertising on the part of the new league.

Personnel

Final roster

The Gamblers, like all other teams, have a 38-man active roster with a 7-man practice squad. Their first picks in the 2022 USFL Draft included quarterback Clayton Thorson (round 1, pick 5), defensive end Chris Odom (round 2, pick 12), and offensive tackle Ahmad Gooden.

Staff 
The Gamblers' first head coach and general manager is Kevin Sumlin, who most recently served as the head coach at Houston, Texas A&M, and Arizona. The team's offense will be headed by two co-coordinators, J. D. Runnels and David Beaty. Runnels comes to the USFL with four years of playing experience in the National Football League and most recently spend one year as the running backs coach at East Central College. Beaty joins the team having most recently served as a consultant at Texas, before which he spent four years as the head coach at Kansas. The defense will be led by Tim Lewis, a former first-round NFL draft pick who played in the league for four seasons before starting his coaching career and has since served as an assistant at the high school, college, and professional ranks (including the NFL and XFL) and as the head coach of the Birmingham Iron of the Alliance of American Football.

Schedule
The Gamblers' 2022 schedule was announced on March 7. They opened the season against the Michigan Panthers. Because the regular season is being held in its entirety at Protective Stadium and Legion Field in Birmingham, Alabama, the Gamblers would technically play all of their games as a traveling team. The schedule format has each team playing a ten-game regular season, consisting of two games against each division opponent and one game against each team in the opposite division.

Note: Intra-division opponents are in bold text. * mean that they host the game, since all eight teams play at the same stadium

Game summaries

Week 1: at Michigan Panthers

The Gamblers started their season against the Michigan Panthers. The Gamblers scored the only points of the first quarter on a 37 yard field goal by Nick Vogel. In the first play of the second quarter, the Panthers were poised to score the first touchdown before a Shea Patterson fumble was returned 90 yards for a touchdown by Reggie Northrop which, after a successful 2-point conversion, put the Gamblers up 11–0. The Panthers forced a Gamblers 3 and out, and on the ensuing punt, returned the punt 40 yards for touchdown. However, an unnecessary roughness call on the Panthers negated the touchdown, putting them on their own 45 yard line. The Gamblers stretched out their lead with a 65 yard drive topped off by an Isaiah Zuber 12 yard touchdown reception, putting the Gamblers up 17–0 after a failed 2-point conversion. The Gamblers had a chance to go up 20–0 with a 27 yard field goal, but it was missed.

The Panthers came out strong after halftime, driving for a touchdown, keeping the Gamblers up 2 scores after a failed 2-point conversion.  In the fourth quarter, the Panthers drove downfield 66 yards for the touchdown, which included a clutch 4th & 6. They again missed a 2-point conversion to put the game within 3 and keep the Gamblers up 17–12, which would be the final score.

Week 2: vs. Birmingham Stallions

For a second time in as many weeks, Stallions quarterback J'Mar Smith led Birmingham to three consecutive second half drives that ended with touchdowns. The reigning USFL Offensive Player of the Week, Smith went 19-of-29 for 214 yards on Saturday. His 34-yard, third quarter touchdown pass to Osirus Mitchell gave the Stallions a 19–18 lead. His 64-yard strike to Marlon Williams stretched Birmingham's lead to 33–21 with just over 13 minutes left.

Houston, who took an 18–13 halftime lead on the strength of Will Likely's 63-yard pick-six, made it a one-possession game when Clayton Thorson connected with Tyler Simmons for a 44-yard touchdown with 12:24 left. The Gamblers comeback bid came up short, however, when Lorenzo Burns recorded his second pick of Thorson with 1:13 left.

Week 3: vs. Tampa Bay Bandits

The Gamblers will play against division rival Tampa Bay Bandits.

Standings

Postseason
Gamblers did not make it to the playoffs after back to back losses.

References

Houston
Houston Gamblers
Houston Gamblers (2022)